Anna-Michelle Asimakopoulou (Greek: Άννα-Μισέλ Ασημακοπούλου, born 27 March 1967) is a Greek lawyer and politician who was elected as a Member of the European Parliament in 2019.

Political career
In parliament, Assimakopoulou has since been serving on the Committee on International Trade and the Committee on Petitions (2019-2020). In 2020, she also joined the Special Committee on Artificial Intelligence in a Digital Age.

In addition to her committee assignments, Assimakopoulou has been part of the parliament's delegation for relations with Israel since 2021. She is also a member of the European Internet Forum, the European Parliament Intergroup on Disability and the MEPs Against Cancer group.

Other activities
 Friends of Europe, Member of the Board of Trustees (since 2020)

References

1967 births
Living people
MEPs for Greece 2019–2024
21st-century women MEPs for Greece
New Democracy (Greece) MEPs
Cornell Law School alumni
Politicians from Athens
Politicians from Ioannina